Baldauf is a Germanic surname. It may refer to:

Christian Baldauf (born 1967), German politician
Dario Baldauf (born 1985), Austrian footballer
Dominik Baldauf (born 1992), Austrian cross country skier
Elisabeth Baldauf (born 1990), Austrian Olympic badminton player
Hannes Baldauf (1938–2015), German footballer 
Joachim Baldauf (born 1965), German photographer
Robert Baldauf ( late 19th – early 20th centuries), Swiss philologist and academic
Rüdiger Baldauf (born 1961), German jazz trumpeter, composer, and arranger
Sari Baldauf (born 1955), Finnish businessperson

See also
Frühauf
Spaeth

Surnames from nicknames